Winterthur Museum, Garden and Library is an American estate and museum in Winterthur, Delaware. Pronounced “winter-tour," Winterthur houses one of the richest collections of Americana in the United States. The museum and estate were the home of Henry Francis du Pont (1880–1969), Winterthur's founder and a prominent antiques collector and horticulturist.

History

Estate 
The property where Winterthur sits was purchased by Éleuthère Irénée du Point (E. I. du Pont) between 1810 and 1818 and was used for farming and sheep-raising. In 1837, E. I du Pont's heirs sold 445 acres of the land to E. I.'s business partner from France, Jacques Antoine Bidermann (1790–1865), and his wife Evelina Gabrielle du Pont (1796–1863) for the purpose of establishing their estate. Evelina was the second daughter of E. I. Du Pont's seven children. Between 1839 and 1842, the couple built a twelve-room Greek revival manor house on the property and named their estate Winterthur after Bidermann's ancestral home in Winterthur,  Switzerland. The Bidermanns also added expansive gardens, livestock, and pastures.

After Bidermann's death, the property passed to his son, James Irénée, who then sold it to his uncle, Henry du Pont. Henry purchased the property for his son, Henry Algernon du Pont. Henry Algernon and his wife, (Mary) Pauline, settled at Winterthur in 1876 and enlarged the estate's existing home. Upon his father's 1889 death, Henry Algernon officially inherited the property and converted its main home to a French-style manor house. Between 1885 and 1925, Henry Algernon and Pauline added 900 acres to the property, which included a grazing area for Holstein cattle. After Pauline's 1902 death and the election of Henry Algernon to Congress, their son, Henry Francis (H. F.) du Pont, assumed the role of estate manager.

H. F. married Ruth Wales in 1916. In 1923, the couple traveled to Vermont to study the cattle-breeding operation of William Seward Webb. During the trip, they visited the home of Webb's daughter-in-law, Electra Havemeyer Webb, a collector of American decorative arts. H. F. later stated that this was when he became interested in collecting American antiques. During the same trip, the du Ponts also visited interior decorator Henry Davis Sleeper. Sleeper's home was decorated with American antiques and interiors taken from other homes. This, too, inspired H .F. start his own collection of Americana.

Henry Algernon died at the end of 1926, and H. F. officially inherited Winterthur in 1927. At the time, the estate consisted of 90 buildings and over 2,600 acres. H. F. and Ruth renovated Winterthur's manor, tripling its size. They outfitted the home with architectural elements salvaged from 17th, 18th, and 19th century American homes in the region, including wood interior paneling from the Grahame House, Belle Isle, and Mordington. Rooms in the home were themed by time period.

Museum 
Winterthur has been called the "largest and richest museum of American furniture and decorative arts in the world." It was formerly known as Henry Francis du Pont Winterthur Museum and as the Winterthur Museum and Country Estate.

H. F. established Winterthur's main building as a public museum for American decorative arts in 1951 and moved to a smaller building on the estate. By 1959, the museum had been expanded to accommodate a library, lecture halls, and additional period rooms. By the time of his death in 1969, H. F. had amassed a collection of between 50,000 and 70,000 objects.

In 1969, the Louise du Pont Crowninshield Research Building, which houses the library and conservation facilities, was dedicated in honor of H. F.'s sister, a noted historic preservationist. A pavilion building, separate from the main house, was built in the 1960s to welcome growing crowds. The visitor center consisted of a cafeteria and museum shop along with an adjacent parking lot. In 1992, additional galleries opened in a new building adjacent to the main house. The galleries host special rotating and permanent exhibits.

Directors 
Winterthur Museum directors have included the following: Joseph Downs (1951–1954), Charles Franklin Montgomery (1954–1961), Edgar Preston Richardson (1962–1966), Charles van Ravenswaay (1966–1976), James Morton Smith (1976–1984), Thomas Ashley Graves Jr. (1985–1992), Dwight Lanmon (1992–1999), Leslie Greene Bowman (1999–2008), David Roselle (2008–2018), Carol Cadou (2018–2021), and Chris Strand (2021–present). The current Charles F. Montgomery Director and CEO of Winterthur is Chris Strand, who previously served as Winterthur's Brown Harrington Director of Garden and Estate and as interim CEO in the months following Cadou's departure.

Present day

Museum 

Winterthur is located in northwestern Delaware, six miles north of Wilmington on Delaware Route 52.

The museum contains 175 period-room displays and approximately ninety thousand objects. Most rooms are open to the public on small, guided tours. The collection spans more than two centuries of American decorative arts, notably from 1640 to 1860, and contains some of the most important pieces of American furniture and fine art.

In 2002, the National Gallery of Art hosted a guest exhibition of three hundred objects curated by Winterthur staff. Antiques Roadshow filmed the first three episodes of its twenty-fourth season at Winterthur in 2019.

Library 
Established in 1952, the Winterthur Library holds more than 87,000 rare books and over 800,000 manuscripts and images. The Winterthur Library is free and open to the public by appointment. Holdings include periodicals, rare books, trade catalogs, manuscripts, ephemera, photographs, slides, paper art, the archives of the Winterthur estate and museum, and other resources that support the needs of researchers in American history, decorative arts, architecture, horticulture, and other subjects. The Joseph Downs Collection of Manuscripts and Printed Ephemera was established in 1955, and the Waldron Phoenix Belknap Jr. Research LIbrary of American Painting was established around 1956. The Winterthur Archives, which includes many of the du Pont family's personal papers, Winterthur estate records, and H. F. du Pont's history of collecting, was formed in 1969 after H. F.'s death.

The library's origins go back to Pierre Samuel du Pont, the family patriarch, who collected eight thousand books before his death in 1817. Subsequent generations of the family continued to grow the collection, with Henry Francis du Pont avidly acquiring rare books for display, particularly 17th-century and 18th-century books with old binding. By the 1940s, H. F. was building a scholarly research collection as part of his plan to transform Winterthur into a museum and teaching institution. Frank Sommer, the first library director, and museum curator Charles F. Montgomery intensified collection development ahead of the 1952 launch of Winterthur's first graduate program. In 1969, the library moved from the main museum to the Crowninshield Research Building, which also houses extensive conservation, research, and education facilities.

Gardens and grounds 
H. F. du Pont, a horticulturalist, began managing the estate's grounds in 1909. He contracted a landscape architect, Marian Cruger Coffin, to assist with the design of 70 acres of the estate's gardens and a model 2400-acre farm. The estate had twelve temperature controlled greenhouses, a 23-acre orchard, a 5.5-acre vegetable garden, and a 4-acre cutting garden. It also had a butcher shop, a saw mill, a tannery, and a dairy where H. F. continued to breed and raise award-winning Holstein cattle. There are at least 6 garden follies throughout the grounds, which were featured in an exhibition that ran from 2018 to 2020. A narrated tram ride through the gardens is available from March through December.

One of the sources who inspired the landscaping at Winterthur was William Robinson, whose book The Wild Garden, published in 1870, recommended mixing large groupings of exotic plantings in natural landscapes. The colors of the plantings have been carefully selected, featuring hundreds of species and hybrid varieties of rhododendrons and azaleas, as well as peonies, forsythia, daffodils, lilacs, mountain laurel, and dogwood. The grounds also offer a pinetum with various types of conifers, such as firs, spruce and hemlocks.

Chandler Farm, a Federal-style historic house on the Winterthur grounds, is used as the home for the director and chief executive of Winterthur.

In 1991, Winterthur began offering paid internships for aspiring horticulturists and stewards of natural lands, who can reside temporarily on the Estate.

In 2002, Winterthur donated a conservation easement on its acreage to the Brandywine Conservation Trust, ensuring that the land would never be developed.

Graduate programs 
Winterthur and the University of Delaware jointly established and continue to offer a pair of master's degree programs in American material culture (established in 1952 by museum director Charles F. Montgomery) and art conservation (established in 1974). As of August 1998, the programs had graduated 580 students, including 209 from the conservation program, which is one of only five graduate programs in the field in North America. The National Endowment for the Humanities has funded the program since 1974. Alumni include curators, artists, and scholars such as Wendell Garrett, Lorraine Waxman Pearce, Jessica Nicoll, Margaret Honda, and Charles L. Venable.

Winterthur offers residential, short-term, and remote fellowships, including postdoctoral, dissertation, and artist fellowships, to support researchers using the collections.

Journal 
Since 1964, Winterthur has published a peer-reviewed interdisciplinary journal entitled Winterthur Portfolio: A Journal of American Material Culture and distributed by the University of Chicago Press. The journal is indexed in the MLA International Bibliography, Scopus, Web of Science, and other research databases.

Display facilities 

 Main museum (period rooms and offices), 
 The Cottage (home of H. F. du Pont after opening of the museum), 
 The Galleries ,  display area
 Research Building 
 Visitors Center

See also 
 National Register of Historic Places listings in northern New Castle County, Delaware
 List of botanical gardens and arboretums in the United States
 Largest historic homes in the United States
 List of museums in Delaware
 Hagley Museum and Library
 Longwood Gardens
 Nemours Estate
 Dominy craftsmen

References

Further reading

External links 

Winterthur Museum, Garden and Library
Houses completed in 1837
Botanical gardens in Delaware
Historic house museums in Delaware
Institutions accredited by the American Alliance of Museums
Du Pont family residences
Brandywine Museums & Gardens Alliance
Museums in New Castle County, Delaware
Museums established in 1951
Decorative arts museums in the United States
Art museums and galleries in Delaware
Geography of New Castle County, Delaware
Libraries in Delaware
Houses in New Castle County, Delaware
Former private collections in the United States
Historic districts on the National Register of Historic Places in Delaware
National Register of Historic Places in New Castle County, Delaware
Georgian Revival architecture in Delaware
Research libraries in the United States
Special collections libraries in the United States